Menzel is a tiny lunar impact crater located in the southeast of the Mare Tranquillitatis. It was named after American astrophysicist Donald H. Menzel. This feature is circular in outline and cup-shaped, with no overlapping impacts of significance. The mare around the crater is nearly devoid of features of interest, except for a nearly submerged crater rim to the northwest, and a few small rises to the north and east.

References

External links

Impact craters on the Moon